Arul Soosai Anthony Sami (1915–1998) also written as A. S. A. Samy, was an Indian director and screenwriter who worked in Tamil films.

Early life 

Born in 1915, A. S. A. Samy was from a devout Catholic family. His father had a business enterprise in Ceylon (now Sri Lanka). He spent his young life there and had his education in Colombo. He received a Bachelor of Arts (Honours) degree from the University of London. He started his career as a teacher in a college in Colombo. He studied literature of both the East and the West and showed a flair for writing plays.

He wrote his first play Bilhanan based on a Sanscrit literature known as Bilhaniyam. He produced the drama and staged during his College's annual day celebrations.

The family returned to India in late 1930s.

Career 

A. S. A. Samy presented his play bilhanan to the All India Radio, Tiruchi station and it was accepted for broadcast.

M. K. Thyagaraja Bhagavathar who was a rising super star in Tamil Cinema at that time played the title role. The radio play became a hit. Another celebrity from the Tamil Stage happened to listen to this play. T. K. Shanmugam, who owned Bala Shanmuganantha Stage troupe together with his brother T. K. Shanmugam bought the play from A. S. A. Samy and successfully staged it. Later, in 1948, he made it as a film with the same title Bilhanan. A. S. A. Samy wrote the screenplay and dialogues. The film produced by Jupiter Pictures.

Following the success of Bilhanan, A. S. A. Samy became acquainted with M. Somasundaram (Somu) and Mohideen, owners of Jupiter Pictures who at that time were working from Central Studios in Coimbatore.

In 1946, Jupiter Pictures produced two films, Valmiki and Sri Murugan. A. S. A. Samy wrote the screenplay and dialogues for both these films. M. G. Ramachandran was a monthly paid actor in Jupiter Pictures. He performed a dance with another actress K. Malathi. The Siva – Parvati dance was well received.

During the shooting of Sri Murugan, M. G. R. and Samy became friends. M. G. R. addressed A. S. A. Samy as Annae (elder brother) as Samy was senior to him. Samy addressed M. G. R. by his name, Ramachandran. He continued to address him by name till the end. It is said that A. S. A. Samy is the only person who addressed M. G. R. by his name.

In 1947, Samy scripted a Raja-Rani story and presented it to M. Somasundaram. Somu was impressed by the story and asked A. S. A. Samy to write the screenplay and dialogues. He also appointed Samy as the Director. Somu wanted to book P. U. Chinnappa and T. R. Rajakumari for the lead roles. A. S. A. Samy did not want to experiment with star actors in the first movie he is going to Direct. He suggested M. G. R. and Malathi for the lead roles.

Samy appointed M. Karunanidhi, then an aspiring young man in his twenties, to write the screenplay and dialogues. Rajakumari was a success film.

In 1949, he directed C. N. Annadurai's Velaikari film.

A. S. A. Samy was active till the end of 1960s. His last film as director, Thirumagal, was released in 1971.

Filmography

As director 

 Thirumagal (1971)
 Maya Sundari (Hindi) (1967)
 Vazhi Pirandhadhu (1964)
 Ananda Jyothi (1963)
 Aasai Alaigal (1963)
 Kadavulai Kanden (1963)
 Muthu Mandapam (1962)
 Arasilankumari (1961)
 Kaithi Kannayiram (1960)
 Kalyanikku Kalyanam (1959)
 Thangapadhumai (1959)
 Karpukkarasi (1957)
 Dingiri Menike (Sinhala) (1956)
 Needhipathi (1955)
 Thuli Visham (1954)
 Oka Talli Pillalu (1953)
 Ponni (1953)
 Sudharshan (1951)
 Vijayakumari (1950)
 Velaikkaari (1949)
 Rajakumari (1947)

Felicitation 

During M. Karunanidhi's Cinema Golden Jubilee celebrations held at Marina Beach, Chennai, he was honoured by Karunanidhi who has become Chief Minister of Tamil Nadu State by then. On the occasion, Karunanidhi said Samy was his teacher in script writing.

A. S. A. Samy was appointed Principal of the Script and Direction Department in the Tamil Nadu Cinema TrainingCollege. When Samy was suffering from paralysis, Karunanithi arranged a payment of ₹100,000 to be paid from the Murasoli Trust.

References

External links 

 
 

1915 births
1998 deaths
Tamil film directors
Screenwriters from Tamil Nadu
Tamil screenwriters
Sri Lankan people of Indian descent
Indian people of Sri Lankan descent
Film directors from Tamil Nadu
20th-century Indian film directors
20th-century Indian screenwriters